is a fighting arcade video game developed and originally released by Taito in Japan on November 1992. Set during the 25th century BC on a prehistoric South America, players assume the role of a warrior commanding his dinosaur companion as he enters a tournament held by the current titular king in order to become the next ruler while facing matches against other rivals. Its gameplay consists of one-on-one fights, with a main three-button configuration, featuring special moves and combo techniques.

Produced under the working title "Project D-Rex", Dino Rex was created by most of the same team behind Gun Frontier and Metal Black, including director Takatsuna Senba and was originally intended to be a shoot 'em up game but it was instead retooled into a fighting title due to the success of games like Capcom's 1991 Street Fighter II: The World Warrior. It is notable for using stop motion animation for each of its dinosaur fighters, predating Atari Games' 1994 Primal Rage two years prior. Initially launched for the arcades, it was later re-released only in Japan under the compilation for PlayStation 2 titled Taito Memories II Jōkan on 25 January 2007.

Dino Rex has been met with negative reception from reviewers since its release, who criticized aspects such as the visuals, controls and difficulty.

Gameplay 

Dino Rex is a fighting game featuring digitized sprites similar to Primal Rage and Reikai Dōshi, where the player fights against other opponents in one-on-one matches and the fighter who manages to deplete the health bar of the opponent wins the first bout and the first person to win two bouts becomes the winner of the match. Each round is timed and if both fighters still have health remaining when time expires, the fighter with more health wins the round. After winning a number of matches, players are induced into a dream sequence that acts as a bonus stage, where the main objective is to decimate a city in the present time.

When playing solo, players assume the role of a warrior, can choose from six playable dinosaurs and fight against computer-controlled fighters, with each one having their own special moves that are performed by entering button commands while moving the joystick. If all of the opponents are defeated, the player will be able to fight against the titular king in order to become the next ruler. A notable feature is the ability to restore health by holding up. Another notable gameplay feature is the power meter, which can be increased three times in a row to perform combos. If the player loses two bouts in a row, the game is over unless the player inserts more credits into the arcade machine to continue playing.

Synopsis

Plot 
Dino Rex begins in the present day, where archaeologists unearthed clay figures of a man riding a dinosaur on ruins located in South America, indicating that both man and dinosaurs coexisted together in a world controlled by Amazones where men from multiple tribes fought for a queen once a year, with one of them proving his dinosaur companion to be much stronger than those from other opponents that he managed to obtain the queen and eventually become the titular king. Players assume the role of a warrior commanding his dinosaur companion as he enters a tournament held by the current king in order to become the next ruler by facing other rivals before arriving at the Auyán-tepui for the last match.

Dinosaurs 
 Allosaurus
 Ceratosaurus
 Tyrannosaurus
 Triceratops
 Monoclonius
 Pachycephalosaurus
 Stygimoloch

Development and release 
Dino Rex was created by most of the same team behind Gun Frontier and Metal Black at Taito, including director Takatsuna Senba and was originally intended to be a helicopter-themed shoot 'em up game, however due to the success of games like Street Fighter II: The World Warrior from Capcom, the project was retooled into a fighting title instead under the working name "Project D-Rex". Senba and his team made use of hand-drawn animations and graphics, as well as crafted model figures of the dinosaur fighters that were then filmed through the process of stop motion animation, preceding Primal Rage by Atari Games two years prior.

Dino Rex was initially only launched for the arcades by Taito in 1992 across Japan and Europe. The game was later re-released only in Japan as part of the compilation titled Taito Memories II Jōkan for PlayStation 2 on 25 January 2007.

Reception 
Dino Rex has garnered negative reception from reviewers in recent years. Kurt Kalata of Hardcore Gaming 101 heavily panned the complicated gameplay and controls, while feeling mixed in regards to the presentation and visuals. Joseph Shaffer of HonestGamers criticized its controls and high difficulty curve.

Notes

References

External links 
 Dino Rex at GameFAQs
 Dino Rex at Giant Bomb
 Dino Rex at Killer List of Videogames
 Dino Rex at MobyGames

1992 video games
Arcade video games
Dinosaurs in video games
Multiplayer and single-player video games
Taito arcade games
Fighting games
Video games set in South America
Video games set in Venezuela
Video games with digitized sprites
Video games developed in Japan